Prophantis coenostolalis is a moth in the family Crambidae. It was described by George Hampson in 1899. It is found in Sierra Leone. It was formerly placed in the Pyraustinae genus Thliptoceras.

References

Moths described in 1899
Spilomelinae